The 1976 Buffalo Bills season was the franchise's 7th season in the National Football League, and the 17th overall.

Buffalo's season was troubled from the start, as the team was in a contract dispute with star running back O. J. Simpson. Simpson had been demanding a trade, before finally agreeing to a three-year, $2.5 million contract.

The Bills started the season 2–2, before losing their final ten games of the season. Quarterback Joe Ferguson only started the first seven games before being sidelined for the season with a back injury. Backup quarterback Gary Marangi started Buffalo's final seven games, all losses.

Fullback Jim Braxton injured his knee in the Bills' season opener and was lost for the season. Simpson still led the NFL in rushing in 1976, even without Braxton's blocking.

Bills head coach Lou Saban resigned after the fifth game of the season, with the Bills struggling at 2–3. Offensive line coach Jim Ringo took over, but would not win a game for the rest of the year.

The lowest point of the season was when O. J. Simpson was ejected from a game for getting into a fight with New England Patriots defensive end Mel Lunsford. Lunsford was also ejected from the game as well. Neither player was fined or suspended by the league.

Offseason 
Before the 1976 season, Buffalo lost some key players, notably wide receivers Ahmad Rashad and J. D. Hill, and defensive linemen Earl Edwards, Walt Patulski and Pat Toomay.

1976 Expansion Draft

NFL draft 

Note: 1976 was the final year in which the NFL draft was seventeen rounds; it would be reduced to twelve rounds in 1977.

The Bills' 1976 draft produced four long-time starters with their first four picks. First round pick Mario Clark played for seven seasons with the Bills. Offensive guard Ken Jones played for the Bills for eleven years. Offensive tackle Joe Devlin played every game of his 14-year career with the Bills, playing in all 191 regular-season games until his retirement after the 1989 season. Defensive end Ben Williams played for the Bills for 10 years; he was a Pro Bowler and second-team All-Pro for the 1982 season.

Personnel

Staff/coaches

Roster

Regular season

Schedule 

Note: Intra-division opponents are in bold text.

Season summary

Week 3

Week 4

Week 12 
O. J. Simpson rushed for 273 yards, setting a Thanksgiving Day record that still holds as of the end of the 2016 season.

Standings

Awards and honors 
 O. J. Simpson, Thanksgiving Day Record, Most Rushing Yards in One Game, 273 yards vs. Detroit Lions, November 25

See also 
 Electric Company

References 

 Bills on Pro Football Reference
 Bills on jt-sw.com
 Bills Stats on jt-sw.com

Buffalo Bills seasons
Buffalo Bills
Buffalo Bills